The 53rd British Academy Film Awards, given by the British Academy of Film and Television Arts on 9 April 2000, honoured the best in film for 1999.

Sam Mendes's American Beauty won the award for Best Film (and previously won the Academy Award for Best Picture), Actor (Kevin Spacey), Actress (Annette Bening), Cinematography, Editing, and Original Music; Spacey previously won the Academy Award for Best Actor. Jude Law (The Talented Mr. Ripley) and Maggie Smith (Tea with Mussolini) won the awards for Best Supporting Actor and Actress, respectively. Pedro Almodóvar, director of All About My Mother, won for his direction. East Is East was voted Outstanding British Film.

The ceremony took place at the Odeon Leicester Square in London and was hosted by Jack Docherty.

The nominations were announced on 1 March 2000.

Winners and nominees

Statistics

See also
 72nd Academy Awards
 25th César Awards
 5th Critics' Choice Awards
 52nd Directors Guild of America Awards
 13th European Film Awards
 57th Golden Globe Awards
 11th Golden Laurel Awards
 20th Golden Raspberry Awards
 4th Golden Satellite Awards
 14th Goya Awards
 15th Independent Spirit Awards
 5th Lumières Awards
 26th Saturn Awards
 6th Screen Actors Guild Awards
 52nd Writers Guild of America Awards

References

External links
 Film in 2000 at BAFTA
 BAFTA Awards (2000) at IMDb

Film053
B
B
April 2000 events in the United Kingdom
2000 in London
1999 awards in the United Kingdom